Rabin Mukherjee College, formerly known as Behala college of commerce, established in 1964 is an undergraduate college in Behala, Kolkata, West Bengal, India. It is affiliated with the University of Calcutta.

Departments

Arts and Commerce
Bengali
English
Economics
Commerce

Accreditation
It is recognized by the University Grants Commission (UGC).

See also 
List of colleges affiliated to the University of Calcutta
Education in India
Education in West Bengal

References

External links
Rabin Mukherjee College

Educational institutions established in 1964
University of Calcutta affiliates
Universities and colleges in Kolkata
Commerce colleges in India
1964 establishments in West Bengal